Sayat-Nova is an impact crater on the planet Mercury. It is located on the southern rim of the larger Beethoven basin.  It is named for the Armenian/Georgian song writer Aruthin Sayadian Sayat-Nova. Its name was approved by the International Astronomical Union in 1979.

References

Impact craters on Mercury